Helfrich's Springs Grist Mill is a historic grist mill located at Whitehall Township, Pennsylvania. The mill, which was built in 1807, is located along Jordan Creek.  It is a three-story, fieldstone mill and measures approximately 30 feet wide and 58 feet deep. It has a slate roof. 

Whitehall Township acquired the property by eminent domain in 1963.  The building is owned and operated by the Whitehall Historical Preservation Society, who began restoring it in 1984.

It was added to the National Register of Historic Places in 1977. A boundary increase in 1999 added the Peter Grim House with NRHP reference number 99001288.

References

External links
Whitehall Historical Preservation Society: Helfrich's Springs Grist Mill

Grinding mills in Pennsylvania
Mill museums in Pennsylvania
Museums in Lehigh County, Pennsylvania
History of Lehigh County, Pennsylvania
Industrial buildings completed in 1807
Grinding mills on the National Register of Historic Places in Pennsylvania
Buildings and structures in Lehigh County, Pennsylvania
National Register of Historic Places in Lehigh County, Pennsylvania